Lloyd James (27 January 1937 – 15 April 2019) was a Bermudian cricketer.

Biography 
James was born in Bermuda.  He was a right-handed batsman and right-arm medium-fast bowler. He played one first-class match for Bermuda, against New Zealand in 1972. It was the maiden first-class match to be played by the Bermuda cricket team.

James held the record for the highest individual score, 173 not out, in Bermuda's annual cup match for over thirty years.

References

External links
Cricket Archive profile
Cricinfo profile

1937 births
2019 deaths
Bermudian cricketers